The European Track Cycling Championships (under-23 & junior) are a set of competition events held annually for the various disciplines and distances in track cycling, exclusively for European cyclists under the ages of 23 and 18, and regulated by the European Cycling Union (UEC). They were first held in their current format in 2010, when a competition for elite level cyclists was devised and held for the first time following an overhaul of European track cycling.

Prior to 2010, similar age group championships were held for many years under the title of European Track Championships, a title now used solely for the elite championships. The Under 23 and Junior championships thereafter were run as an annual separate event under their current name.

In line with cycling tradition, winners of an event at the championships are presented with, in addition to the gold medal, a special, identifiable jersey. This UEC European Champion jersey is a blue jersey with gold European stars.

History

Age group championships

Prior to 2010, championship events were run simply as European Track Championships, but solely for junior and under-23 cyclists. The 2010 event is recognised as the first elite level senior championships. Since 2010, the separate annual European championships for under-23 and junior riders have continued, described explicitly as such.

European Track Cycling Championships have, however, been held for junior and under-23 athletes for a long time, though records in earlier editions are incomplete. They provided useful experience for young riders with winners automatically qualifying to compete at the UCI Track Cycling World Championships in which no age limit applied, and the world's best track cyclists competed.

Events included

Current events for juniors: time trial, keirin, individual pursuit, team pursuit, points race, scratch race, sprint, team sprint and, the madison. Women's events are as a general rule, shorter than men's, although the women's Team Pursuit was recently increased in length and number of riders to improve parity.

Championships are open to riders selected by their national cycling governing body. They compete in the colours of their country.

Competitions

All-time medal table (2001-2022)
Exclude Men's Open Madison events from 2001-2009 and include Open Omnium events from 2001–2009.

See also
 UEC European Track Championships

References

External links
 European Cycling Union, organiser of the event

European cycling championships
Under-23 cycle racing
Cycling Track